Chicken Feed is a 1927 American short silent comedy film directed by Anthony Mack. It was the 66th Our Gang short subject released.

Cast

The Gang
 Joe Cobb as Joe
 Jackie Condon as Jackie
 Allen Hoskins as Farina
 Jannie Hoskins as Mango
 Scooter Lowry as Skooter
 Jay R. Smith as Jay
 Bobby Young as Bonedust

Additional cast
 Jean Darling as Jean
 Johnny Downs as Prof. Presto Misterio (magician)
 Bobby Hutchins as Toddler chasing the monkey
 Harry Spear as Audience member
 Ham Kinsey as Animal trainer
 Jimsy Boudwin as Audience member
 Bobby Mallon as Audience member
 Davey Monahan as Audience member
 Andy Shuford as Audience member
 Pal the Dog as himself

See also
 Our Gang filmography

References

External links

1927 films
American silent short films
American black-and-white films
1927 comedy films
1927 short films
Films directed by Robert A. McGowan
Hal Roach Studios short films
Our Gang films
Films with screenplays by H. M. Walker
1920s American films
Silent American comedy films